Shum Yip Upperhills Tower 1 is a supertall skyscraper completed in Shenzhen, Guangdong, China. Construction started on 12 February 2014 and was completed in 2020.

The tower has a novel structural system called a "Ladder Core System" where the perimeter mega columns are connected to the central reinforced concrete core at every story as opposed to the typical configuration where they are only connected via outriggers at mechanical floors.

Additionally, unlike other supertall skyscrapers with mega-columns, Shum Yip T1 does not have any supplemental gravity columns in the office portion of the tower.  The corner framing on either side of the mega-columns is cantilevered 8.5m, which creates a balanced cantilever thus reducing the demand of the middle span an achieving a 28.5m column free span between the two mega-columns on each face.

See also

List of tallest buildings in Shenzhen
List of tallest buildings in China
List of tallest buildings in the world

References

Skyscraper office buildings in Shenzhen
Skyscrapers in Shenzhen
Skyscraper hotels in Shenzhen
Skidmore, Owings & Merrill buildings